The AMD Radeon 600 series is a series of graphics processors developed by AMD. Its cards are desktop and mobile rebrands of previous generation GCN cards, available only for OEMs. The series is targeting the entry-level segment and launched on August 13, 2019.

Products

Desktop & Laptop 
 Supported display standards on desktop models are: DisplayPort 1.4a (HBR3), HDMI 2.0b, HDR10 color.
 Dual Link DVI also supported on Radeon RX 640.

See also 
 List of AMD graphics processing units

References

External links 

AMD graphics cards
Computer-related introductions in 2019
Graphics processing units
Graphics cards